2nd Combat Engineer Regiment may refer to:

 2nd Combat Engineer Regiment (Australia), a regiment of the Royal Australian Engineers.
 2 Combat Engineer Regiment (Canada), a regiment of the Canadian Military Engineers.

See also
 2nd Alpine Engineer Regiment, a regiment of the Italian Army.
 2nd Combat Engineer Battalion, a battalion of the United States Marine Corps.
 2nd Foreign Engineer Regiment, a regiment of the French Foreign Legion.